Sevdalin Ilkov is a Bulgarian sprint canoer who competed in the early 1980s. He won a bronze medal in the C-2 500 m event at the 1981 ICF Canoe Sprint World Championships in Nottingham.

References

Bulgarian male canoeists
Living people
Year of birth missing (living people)
ICF Canoe Sprint World Championships medalists in Canadian